J.J. Inc. is an album by jazz trombonist J. J. Johnson, released in 1961.

Reception
Trombonist Steve Turre said of the album, "J.J. Inc. finds the master in a sextet setting, with an incredible line-up of young talent." He further states, "You can hear more blues in J.J.'s solos than in his younger bandmates, and that depth of feeling is always apparent in whatever he plays, whenever he plays. J.J. said that this was one of the best groups he ever put together, and he enjoyed playing with them very much." AllMusic's Scott Yanow rated the album four and a half stars and described it as "a fine straight ahead set".

The Penguin Guide to Jazz rated the album three and a half out of four stars, stating that "Aquarius is the best evidence yet of J.J.'s great skills as a composer-arranger."

Track listing

All compositions by Johnson except where noted.

 "Mohawk" – 9:22
 "Minor Mist" - 5:08
 "In Walked Horace" - 5:11
 "Fatback" - 6:35
 "Aquarius" - 5:56
 "Shutterbug" - 7:25
 "Blue and Boogie" (Dizzy Gillespie, Frank Paparelli) - 5:51 (CD bonus track)
 "Turnpike" - 13:06 (CD bonus track)
 "Fatback" - 11:42 (CD bonus track)

Personnel 
 J. J. Johnson – trombone
 Freddie Hubbard – trumpet
 Clifford Jordan – tenor saxophone
 Cedar Walton – piano
 Arthur Harper – double bass
 Albert Heath – drums

See also
 J. J. Johnson discography

References

J. J. Johnson albums
1961 albums
Columbia Records albums
Albums produced by Teo Macero